Pharsatar (alternately known as Phursatar) is a village in Siar Mandal, Ballia district, Uttar Pradesh, India. The village is governed by a Gram panchayat. People of the village use to go Siar, also known as Belthara Road,  almost every day for their necessities because it is the nearest market well connected to the village. In 2021 Villagers elected Pappu Bhai as Gram Pradhan of Farsatar.

It is one of the largest villages in Ballia District.

References

Villages in Ballia district